was a  passenger ship that Furness, Withy's Furness Bermuda Line operated between New York and Bermuda from 1928 until 1931.

She was damaged by two fires in 1931, the second of which put her beyond economic repair. In 1933 she was being towed to be scrapped when she broke adrift, ran ashore and was wrecked.

Bermuda has been referred to as the unluckiest liner ever built or ever to go afloat.

Building
Furness, Withy ordered Bermuda in 1926 to exploit an opportunity created when the Royal Mail Steam Packet Company withdrew its service between the USA, Bermuda and the West Indies. Normally it would take 27 months to build a ship of such size, but Workman, Clark and Company in Belfast completed Bermuda just 16 months after laying her keel. She was launched in July 1927 and completed that December.

She was powered by 16-cylinder Doxford two-stroke diesel engines that developed a combined power output of 2,772 NHP.

Success
Bermuda had berths for 691 passengers: 616 in first class and 75 in second class. Her public areas included a cinema, stage, dance floors, swimming pool and gymnasium. She entered service in January 1928.

Furness, Withy had intended to run Bermuda between New York and Hamilton only seasonally, from December to May, and use her as a cruise ship for the rest of the year. But she proved so popular that the company kept her on the Bermuda route all year round.

Fires

On the 15 June 1931 Bermuda berthed at the quayside at No. 1 Shed Front Street in the City of Hamilton. On the night of 16 June, a fire was discovered in an empty cabin and doused by crew members. Two other fires, one in the bow and the other in the on the starboard side of the stern, were discovered at 03:00 Hours on the 17 June 1931. The ship was partially sunk by opening the stopcocks, preventing the fire from reaching the lower decks or igniting the fuel supply, but the upper decks were consumed and the fire threatened to spread to the buildings on the opposite side of Front Street. The Hamilton Fire Brigade and the ship's crew were joined by soldiers and marines, and the fire was finally brought under control after sailors from the Royal Naval Dockyard arrived with asbestos suits and equipment and training for fighting fires on warships. From the harbour, the Furness-Withy tender Castle Harbour (which was to become  during the Second World War, when it was sunk by a German submarine) and the Royal Navy tugs Sandboy and Creole trained thirty hoses on the Bermuda. Another Furness-Withy vessel, the tender Bermudian, was also sent to help. The fire was brought under control after nearly four hours. One person, the ship's assistant barber, died in the fire, which gutted much of Bermuda's passenger accommodation. Her hull and main engines were undamaged,  and she was towed back to Belfast, where Workman, Clark and Company began to rebuild her superstructure and overhaul her.

In November 1931 work was nearly complete when Bermuda caught fire again. This fire was lower down in the ship, accessible only along narrow companionways that were full of smoke by the time the Belfast Fire Brigade arrived. The brigade fought the blaze but it spread, forcing firemen to withdraw from the ship after barely an hour.

The fire caused so much damage that the ship sank at the quayside. The wreck was raised on Christmas Eve 1931. Damage from the two fires was estimated to cost her underwriters £1.25 million. Workman, Clark bought the wreck, removed her engines and some of her fittings and sold her hulk for scrap. Furness Bermuda Line replaced Bermuda with sister ships the Queen of Bermuda and Monarch of Bermuda.

Shipwreck
Metal Industries, Limited bought the hulk and planned to scrap her at Rosyth. In April 1933 the United Towing Company's  steam tug Seaman started to tow Bermuda from Belfast around the north coast of Scotland to reach the Firth of Forth.

However, on 30 April 1933 her two tow lines broke, and Bermuda drifted ashore on the Badcall Islands in Eddrachillis Bay, Sutherland. Her tow lines were reattached and Seaman pulled her off the rocks, but the lines broke again. The hulk was washed further inshore, and grounded where she could not be refloated.

Much of the hulk was salvaged where she lay. But three large parts of her, particularly her stern, remain.

References

Bibliography

1927 ships
1931 fires in the United Kingdom
Maritime incidents in 1931
Maritime incidents in 1933
Passenger ships of the United Kingdom
Ship fires
Ships built in Belfast
Shipwrecks of Scotland